Udon Thani Hospital is the main hospital of Udon Thani Province, Thailand and is classified under the Ministry of Public Health as a regional hospital. It has a CPIRD Medical Education Center which trains doctors for the Faculty of Medicine of Khon Kaen University.

History 
Udon Thani Hospital was built on land initially owned by the Ministry of Education which was used as housing for staff under the ministry working in Monthon Udon. When the housing turned to disuse, this land was transferred in 1951 and designated for the construction of a hospital. However, funding was little and thus some donations were received from the Thung Sri Mueang annual festival. The hospital had its foundation stone laid on 29 June 1953 and the hospital completed and opened on 24 April 1954.  In 2007, the hospital made an agreement to train medical students and act as a clinical teaching hospital for the Faculty of Medicine, Naresuan University and about one hundred medical students are trained here annually under the Collaborative Project to Increase Production of Rural Doctors (CPIRD) program.

See also 

 Healthcare in Thailand
 Hospitals in Thailand
 List of hospitals in Thailand

References 

Hospitals in Thailand
Udon Thani province